Walfrido Salmito de Almeida Airport , is the airport serving São Benedito, Brazil.

History 
The airport was commissioned on November 25, 2013.

Airlines and destinations

Access

See also

List of airports in Brazil

References

External links

Airports in Ceará
Airports established in 2013